
Gmina Besko is a rural gmina (administrative district) in Sanok County, Subcarpathian Voivodeship, in south-eastern Poland. The gmina also contains the villages of Mymoń and Poręby.

Ethnic groups in the region include Poles and Pogorzans.

Neighbouring gminas
Gmina Besko is bordered by the gminas of Haczów, Rymanów and Zarszyn.

Massacre during Second World War
During the German Invasion of Poland in 1939, German forces on 11 September murdered 21 villagers. The victims include Poles and Ukrainians, one woman, and a priest.

References

Besko
Sanok County
Massacres in Poland
Germany–Poland relations
World War II crimes in Poland